"The Saga Begins" is a parody song by "Weird Al" Yankovic. It parodies "American Pie"  by Don McLean, with lyrics that humorously summarize the plot of the film Star Wars: Episode I – The Phantom Menace through the point of view of Obi-Wan Kenobi, one of the film's protagonists.

The song's title, not mentioned in the lyrics, derives from a tagline that appeared in teaser trailers and the film poster for The Phantom Menace: "Every saga has a beginning". "The Saga Begins" was released as a single from the 1999 album Running with Scissors, and later appearing on the compilation album The Saga Begins.

History
Set to the tune of Don McLean's "American Pie", "The Saga Begins" recounts the plot of Star Wars: Episode I – The Phantom Menace, from Obi-Wan Kenobi's point of view. Yankovic gathered most of the information he needed to write the song from Internet spoilers. Lucasfilm declined a request for an advance screening, and Yankovic paid to attend a charity fundraiser pre-screening. He had done such an accurate job with the storyline that he made only minor alterations after the pre-screening.

McLean approved of the song and, according to Yankovic, also has said that his children played it so much that "he'd start thinking about Jedis and Star Wars, and it would mess him up" in concert. According to Yankovic's website, Lucasfilm's official response to the song was, "You should've seen the smile on (George Lucas') face." This is the second Star Wars song Weird Al has created, with the first being 1980's "Yoda", a parody of "Lola" by The Kinks.

Music video
The video begins in the desert on the planet Tatooine. Yankovic, dressed like Obi-Wan Kenobi, the protagonist of Episode I, walks until he comes across  Darth Sidious playing the piano. Yankovic uses the Force to get a resonator guitar, and in the second verse he reappears performing in a Mos Eisley cantina leading a band also dressed as Jedi. In the last verse, he returns to the desert; and in the last chorus, numerous "Obi-Wan" clones sing as a group.
Some Star Wars characters can be seen, such as Queen Padmé Amidala (played by Al's cousin, Tammy), Qui-Gon Jinn, Mace Windu, and Yoda.
The upper half of the pianist's face is always covered by the hood of the robe that he is wearing much like the Sith Lord Darth Sidious. When asked why, Yankovic stated that, "They didn't want to scare small children," a reference to the playful teasing of Yankovic's pianist, Rubén Valtierra, commonly used in his live shows.

In 2011, the entire video was released as a bonus feature in a Star Wars spoofs compilation for the 2011 Blu-ray box set release of the saga.

Live version
Al and his band usually perform "The Saga Begins" and Al's earlier Star Wars parody, "Yoda" as an encore. It is usually preceded by a cover of Johann Sebastian Bach's "Toccata and Fugue in D Minor" by Al's keyboardist, Rubén Valtierra. During the 2007-2008 Straight Outta Lynwood Tour, the two were moved to the middle, and Al and his band performed "Albuquerque" as the encore.

Response from Don McLean
McLean gave Yankovic permission to release the parody, although he did not make a cameo appearance in its music video, despite popular rumor. McLean himself praised the parody, even admitting to almost singing Yankovic's lyrics during his own live performances because his children played the song so often.

Radio edit
The song was played frequently on Radio Disney and later released on Radio Disney Jams Volume 2. Radio Disney took issue with his line "Did you see him hitting on the queen?" and removed it (so that the song skipped slightly). Yankovic, who usually does not like to change lyrics to suit the needs of others, provided Radio Disney with an updated version, having changed the words to "Did you see him talking to the queen?" He said that the alternate lyrics were preferable to the bad edit.

Charts

References

External links
"Weird Al" Yankovic - The Saga Begins - Official music video on YouTube

"Weird Al" Yankovic songs
1999 singles
Music of Star Wars
Music videos directed by "Weird Al" Yankovic
Songs with lyrics by "Weird Al" Yankovic
American folk rock songs
Star Wars: Episode I – The Phantom Menace
1999 songs

pt:The Saga Begins